Wolf v Stadt Frankfurt am Main (2010) C-229/08 is a European labour law case, concerning age discrimination.

Facts
People being recruited to the fire service went through a rigorous fitness test. Very few officers were aged over 45 and none were over 50 years old. The fire service had an age limit of joining the fire service set at 30 years old. It argued this was a genuine occupational requirement, for the purpose of ensuring fitness. Therefore, it was not unlawful age discrimination.

Judgment
The ECJ held that an age limit of 30 for joining the fire service was a genuine occupational requirement, to ensure the fitness of the people being recruited.

See also

UK labour law

Notes

References

2010 in case law
German case law
Court of Justice of the European Union case law
2010 in Germany
2010 in the European Union
English trusts case law
European Union labour case law